"29" is a song by American singer Demi Lovato. It was released on August 17, 2022, by Island Records, as the third single from Lovato's eighth studio album, Holy Fvck (2022). The singer wrote the song with Oak Felder, Alex Niceforo, Keith Sorrells, Laura Veltz and Sean Douglas. Produced by Felder, Niceforo and Sorrells, "29" is a rock song with lyrics about age gaps in relationships.

The song debuted at number 96 on the US Billboard Hot 100 and 95 on the Canadian Hot 100. Also, reached top ten on the Hot Rock & Alternative Songs chart. Lovato performed "29" on The Tonight Show Starring Jimmy Fallon and the single is included in the set list of the Holy Fvck Tour.

Background 
On June 6, 2022, Demi Lovato announced her eighth studio album, Holy Fvck, set to release on August 19, along with its cover, months after confirming the "funeral" of her pop music and her return to her rock and pop punk roots. A press release indicated that the album would include sixteen tracks. Weeks later, on July 14, the album's tracklist was revealed, with "29" being the sixth song.

Composition and lyrics 
The song is composed in the key of C-sharp minor, and follows a tempo of 184 beats per minute. Lovato performs with a vocal range of G-sharp3 to E5.

Upon posting a snippet of the song on TikTok, fans speculated that the lyrics are a reference to Lovato's ex-boyfriend Wilmer Valderrama, whom she dated for 6 years. They met when she was 17 and he was 29, as the lyrics of the song say: "Finally 29, 17 would never cross my mind". It quickly became a viral trend on the app, prompting people to share their stories about grooming and abusive relationships with an inappropriate age gap.

Regarding the song's subject matter, Lovato stated to Zane Lowe in an interview with Apple Music that she "feel[s] like the song says it all" and that "I don't have to say too much, to be honest, but turning 29 was a huge eye-opener for me. I would be lying if I said I didn't have a ton of anxiety about putting out this song", further adding "I just said, 'I have to go for this. I have to own my truth.' Yeah. And I do still walk that line very finely. I've learned that sometimes saying less is more."

Release and promotion 
"29" was first announced as the album's third single by Billboard. The song was officially confirmed as a single by Lovato and it was released on August 17, 2022. Island Records released it to the US Contemporary hit radio days later.

Lovato performed "29" on The Tonight Show Starring Jimmy Fallon on August 18, 2022, as part of her three-night takeover of the show to promote the album. She also performed the song as part of the setlist of her Holy Fvck Tour. In addition, the official Vevo Live performance of the song was released, along with performances of "Eat Me", "Freak" and "Happy Ending".

Critical reception 
"29" received positive reviews from music critics. The song was described by James Hall of The Daily Telegraph as "a soaring slab of radio-friendly rock". Sputnikmusic said that songs like "29" immediately "raise the stakes lyrically".

Samantha Olson of Seventeen named "29" as one of the best songs released in 2022. Callie Ahlgrim of Insider ranked "29" as the best song on Holy Fvck. Ahlgrim praised the way that Lovato "manages to sing from a place of wisdom and maturity without shying away from the details", and the inclusion of "frank references to menstruation and daddy issues". Billboard journalist Stephen Daw ranked it as one of the best songs on the album, stating that "sounds like the kind of musing that comes after years of finding the right words to say about a traumatic event". AllMusic critic Neil Yeung claimed the most attention-grabbing moment comes on "29", "a scathing takedown of a past relationship with mind-blowing lyrics". Emily Swingle of Clash stated "nothing compares to the raw pain captured on the song". Also named "29" as "undeniably the stand-out track in every way", "harrowing and outstanding". Praised Lovato's powerful vocals and soaring drums and guitars, and said that "are goose-bump inducing, a bruising ache of emotion".

The song was included by Los Angeles Times in the list of the 100 Best songs of 2022.

Accolades

Commercial performance
"29" debuted on the US Billboard Hot 100 at number 96, her 36th entry on the chart; and the only song from Holy Fvck to appear on the chart to date. It also charted at number 95 on the Canadian Hot 100. As well, it was her first top-ten on the Hot Rock & Alternative Songs chart, and her sixth song to chart on the Billboard Global 200.

Credits and personnel 
Obtained from Lovato's official website.
 Demi Lovato - vocals, songwriting
 Warren "Oak" Felder - production, songwriting, recording, programming, background vocals, drums, keyboards
 Alex Niceforo - songwriting, co-production, programming, background vocals, guitar
 Keith "Ten4" Sorrells - songwriting, co-production, programming, background vocals, guitar, bass, drums
 Sean Douglas - songwriting, background vocals
 Laura Veltz - songwriting, background vocals
 Oscar Linnander - production assistance
 Manny Marroquin - mixing
 Zach Pereyra - mixing assistance
 Anthony Vilchis - mixing assistance
 Trey Station - mixing assistance
 Chris Gehringer - mastering

Charts

Release history

References 

2022 singles
2022 songs
Demi Lovato songs
Island Records singles
Songs written by Demi Lovato
Songs written by Oak Felder
Songs written by Laura Veltz
Songs written by Sean Douglas (songwriter)
Songs written by Keith Sorrells